Jim Guthrie (born July 13, 1955, in Pocatello, Idaho) is an American politician and a Republican member of the Idaho Senate. Since 2012, he has represented District 28, and previously served in the Idaho House of Representatives from 2010 to 2012 for District 29 Seat B.

Early life and career 
Guthrie graduated from Marsh Valley High School. He was a Bannock County Commissioner from 2001 until 2007. In 2016, an extramarital affair between Guthrie and Idaho Representative Christy Perry was brought to light by a political activist after an interview with Guthrie's former wife.

Elections
Idaho Senate District 28

2018
Guthrie defeated Alan B. Curtis with 63.3% of the vote to win the Republican primary. In the general election, he defeated Democrat Mike Saville with 61.9% of the vote.

2016
Guthrie was unopposed in the Republican primary.

Guthrie defeated Mike Saville in the general election with 61.6% of the vote.

2014
Guthrie was unopposed in the Republican primary and general election.

2012
Redistricted to District 28, Guthrie chose to run for its open senate seat.

He won the Republican primary with 65.3% of the vote against W. Rusty Barlow.

Guthrie defeated Democratic nominee Dave Finkelnburg in the general election with 66.1% of the vote to succeed Republican Senator Steve Bair, who was redistricted to District 31.

2006
When Democratic Senator Bert Marley left the District 29 seat open for a run as Superintendent of Public Instruction.

Guthrie ran unopposed in the Republican primary.

Guthrie lost the general election by 370 votes to Democrat Diane Bilyeu.

Idaho House of Representatives District 29 Seat B

2010
With Democratic Representative James D. Ruchti vacating the District 29 B seat, Guthrie ran unopposed in the Republican primary.

Guthrie won general election with 59.8% of the vote against Greg Anderson.

References

1955 births
21st-century American politicians
County commissioners in Idaho
Republican Party Idaho state senators
Living people
Republican Party members of the Idaho House of Representatives
People from Pocatello, Idaho